Barbara Sykes is an American politician who served as a member of the Ohio House of Representatives, representing the 44th district from 2001 to 2006.  Prior to that she served on the Akron City Council.

External links 
Profile on the Ohio Ladies' Gallery website
Project Vote Smart - Representative Vernon Sykes (OH) profile
Follow the Money - Vernon Sykes
2006 2000 1998 1996 campaign contributions

|-

1951 births
21st-century American politicians
21st-century American women politicians
Living people
Members of the Ohio House of Representatives
Women state legislators in Ohio